Kim Bum-Soo (born 29 August 1968) is a retired South Korean footballer and football goalkeeper coach.

He worked Korea Football Association as full-time goalkeeper coach for youth team from 2003 to 2006.

References

External links 
 

1968 births
Living people
Association football goalkeepers
South Korean footballers